Amilton Miguel Santana Filho (born 2 February 1991) is a footballer who plays as a midfielder for Premier League of Belize club Belmopan Bandits SC. Born in Brazil, he represents the Belize national team.

References 

1991 births
Living people
Footballers from Brasília
Brazilian footballers
Association football midfielders
Brazilian emigrants to Belize
Naturalized citizens of Belize
Belizean footballers
Belizean people of Brazilian descent
Premier League of Belize players
Police United FC (Belize) players
Belmopan Bandits players
Belize international footballers